Stockport is a city in Van Buren County, Iowa, United States. The population was 272 at the time of the 2020 census.

Geography
Stockport is located at  (40.856993, -91.833341).

Demographics

2010 census
As of the census of 2010, there were 296 people, 112 households, and 76 families living in the city. The racial makeup of the city was 97.0% White, 0.3% Native American, 1.0% Asian, and 1.7% from two or more races. Hispanic or Latino of any race were 0.3% of the population.

There were 112 households, of which 38.4% had children under the age of 18 living with them, 56.3% were married couples living together, 6.3% had a female householder with no husband present, 5.4% had a male householder with no wife present, and 32.1% were non-families. 26.8% of all households were made up of individuals, and 13.4% had someone living alone who was 65 years of age or older. The average household size was 2.64 and the average family size was 3.29.

The median age in the city was 33.8 years. 31.1% of residents were under the age of 18; 8.8% were between the ages of 18 and 24; 28.7% were from 25 to 44; 19.3% were from 45 to 64; and 12.2% were 65 years of age or older. The gender makeup of the city was 50.7% male and 49.3% female.

2000 census
As of the census of 2000, there were 284 people, 120 households, and 71 families living in the city. The racial makeup of the city was 95.77% White, 0.35% Native American, 3.17% from other races, and 0.70% from two or more races. Hispanic or Latino of any race were 3.52% of the population.

There were 120 households, out of which 30.0% had children under the age of 18 living with them, 49.2% were married couples living together, 4.2% had a female householder with no husband present, and 40.8% were non-families. 35.0% of all households were made up of individuals, and 20.8% had someone living alone who was 65 years of age or older. The average household size was 2.37 and the average family size was 3.13.

In the city, the population was spread out, with 27.1% under the age of 18, 9.2% from 18 to 24, 26.4% from 25 to 44, 21.5% from 45 to 64, and 15.8% who were 65 years of age or older. The median age was 33 years. For every 100 females, there were 113.5 males. For every 100 females age 18 and over, there were 120.2 males.

The median income for a household in the city was $28,438, and the median income for a family was $31,563. Males had a median income of $28,375 versus $19,750 for females. The per capita income for the city was $13,389. About 8.3% of families and 10.2% of the population were below the poverty line, including 10.1% of those under the age of eighteen and 20.6% of those 65 or over.

Education
The community is served by the Van Buren County Community School District. It was previously in the Van Buren Community School District, until it merged into Van Buren County CSD on July 1, 2019.

The former Van Buren CSD operated Stockport Elementary School in the late 1990s. There was a middle school in Stockport, but in 2011 Van Buren CSD school board chose to close that building and move the middle school to Keosauqua. The vote was a 4-2 basis, and done to reduce expenses.

References

Cities in Van Buren County, Iowa
Cities in Iowa